"World in My Eyes" is a song by English electronic music band Depeche Mode. It was released on 17 September 1990 as the fourth and final single from their seventh studio album, Violator (1990). The song peaked at number two in Denmark and Spain, number 17 on the UK Singles Chart, and number 52 on the US Billboard Hot 100.

Background
"Martin did the demo on his own," recalled Andy Fletcher. "I don't remember it standing out when we heard it then. But somehow, in the studio, it all came together brilliantly… Whenever I'm asked which of our tracks is my favourite, I always say 'World in My Eyes'." Martin Gore also stated that the song is a very positive song. "It's saying that love and sex and pleasure are positive things."

Additionally Gore explained the stages it went through in terms of the original demo version.

"I remember the original demo of "World In My Eyes" being slightly faster and maybe slightly more obvious. While we were recording it in Milan, Dave was going away for a couple of days, so we worked on it and turned it into this really moody piece. I can remember Dave arriving back in the studio, slightly jet-lagged and being totally shocked, thinking that we just ruined the song, but half a day later he came back and said 'That's really good, the way it's turned out'. It always takes a while to get used to things.

Release
The "World in My Eyes" single release includes two exclusive B-sides, "Happiest Girl" and "Sea of Sin", which were mixed by François Kevorkian and feature additional production by Alan Friedman. The Jack Mix and Tonal Mix are the main 7" versions respectively, while the 12" versions are Kiss-A-Mix and Sensoria. No "original" versions of either tracks were released, or rather, both mixes serve as the finished versions of the tracks. The cover art for "World in My Eyes" has a photo of one of the band members making a shape similar to that of glasses with their hands. 

The 12" mix of "World in My Eyes" is the Oil Tank Mix, which was also mixed by Kevorkian, although it features a large amount of added synth overdubs by Friedman and does not include the chorus or third verse. The 2004 re-release of the EU single includes a longer intro for this mix. On the Limited 12", there are pictures of all four members on the back of the sleeve. This includes two remixes of "World in My Eyes" and one of "Happiest Girl".

Music video
The music video for "World in My Eyes" was directed by Anton Corbijn. There are two versions; the original version was not originally released to the public until The Videos 86-98. The original music video features some footage from the World Violation Tour, while Dave Gahan and a girl he's with watch it from a drive-in cinema. The alternate version on Strange Too features the band in the car instead, more live footage, and the silent ending with Gahan is longer.

Track listings
All songs were written by Martin L. Gore.

7-inch, cassette: Mute / Bong20, CBong20 (UK)
 "World in My Eyes" – 3:58
 "Happiest Girl (Jack Mix)" – 4:57 (remixed by François Kevorkian and Alan Friedman)
 "Sea of Sin (Tonal Mix)" – 4:43 (remixed by François Kevorkian and Alan Friedman)

12-inch: Mute / 12Bong20 (UK)
 "World in My Eyes (Oil Tank Mix)" – 7:29 (remixed by François Kevorkian and Alan Friedman)
 "Happiest Girl (Kiss-A-Mix)" – 6:15 (remixed by François Kevorkian and Alan Friedman)
 "Sea of Sin (Sensoria)" – 6:06 (remixed by François Kevorkian and Alan Friedman)

12-inch: Mute / L12Bong20 (UK)
 "World in My Eyes (Dub in My Eyes)" – 6:55 (remixed by François Kevorkian and Alan Friedman)
 "World in My Eyes (Mode to Joy)" – 6:32 (remixed by Jon Marsh)
 "Happiest Girl (The Pulsating Orbital Mix)" – 6:28 (remixed by Dr. Alex Paterson and Thrash)

CD: Mute / CDBong20 (UK)
 "World in My Eyes" – 4:00
 "World in My Eyes (Oil Tank Mix)" – 6:53
 "Happiest Girl (Kiss-A-Mix)" – 5:24
 "Sea of Sin (Tonal Mix)" – 3:37
 The three mixes are shorter because the CD single was planned to be a 3-inch CD and the songs were edited down to fit. However, even after the 3-inch plans were scrapped in favour of a regular CD, the edits were used anyway for the UK release. The German release (Mute INT 826.945), although displaying the same track list, uses the longer versions of these three mixes.

CD: Mute / LCDBong20 (UK)
 "World in My Eyes (Dub in My Eyes)" – 6:57
 "World in My Eyes (Mode to Joy)" – 6:31
 "Happiest Girl (The Pulsating Orbital Vocal Mix)" – 8:01 (remixed by Dr. Alex Paterson and Thrash)
 "Sea of Sin (Sensoria)" – 6:07
 "World in My Eyes (Mayhem Mode)" – 4:58 (remixed by Jon Marsh)
 "Happiest Girl (Jack Mix)" – 4:57

CD: Mute / CDBong20X (EU; 2004)
 "World in My Eyes" – 3:58
 "Happiest Girl (Jack Mix)" – 4:57
 "Sea of Sin (Tonal Mix)" – 4:43
 "World in My Eyes (Oil Tank Mix)" – 7:47
 "Happiest Girl (Kiss-A-Mix)" – 6:15
 "Sea of Sin (Sensoria)" – 6:06
 "World in My Eyes (Dub in My Eyes)" – 6:55
 "World in My Eyes (Mode to Joy)" – 6:32
 "Happiest Girl (The Pulsating Orbital Mix)" – 6:28
 "World in My Eyes (Mayhem Mode)" – 4:56
 "Happiest Girl (The Pulsating Orbital Vocal Mix)" – 8:01
 The "Oil Tank Mix" on this CD has a longer intro

CD: Sire/Reprise / 9 21735-2 (US)
 "World in My Eyes" – 3:59
 "World in My Eyes (Oil Tank Mix)" – 7:29
 "Happiest Girl (The Pulsating Orbital Mix)" – 6:28
 "Sea of Sin (Tonal Mix)" – 4:44
 "World in My Eyes (Mode to Joy)" – 6:32
 "Happiest Girl (Jack Mix)" – 4:58
 "Sea of Sin (Sensoria)" – 6:07

Personnel
 David Gahan – lead vocals
 Martin Gore – guitar, keyboard, backing vocals
 Alan Wilder – keyboard, drum machine, backing vocals
 Andrew Fletcher – keyboard, backing vocals

Charts

Notable cover versions 
The Cure covered the song for the 1998 tribute album For the Masses.

References

External links
 Single information from the official Depeche Mode web site
 Allmusic review 

1990 singles
1990 songs
Depeche Mode songs
Music videos directed by Anton Corbijn
Mute Records singles
Song recordings produced by Flood (producer)
Songs written by Martin Gore